Khalid Mahmood is a Pakistani para-athlete. In 1992, along with Khawar Malik, he became one of Pakistan's first two Paralympians, competing at the 1992 Summer Paralympics in Barcelona, Spain. Mahmood competed in the discus event in the B1 class.

References

Living people
Pakistani male discus throwers
Paralympic athletes of Pakistan
Track and field athletes with disabilities
Pakistani disabled sportspeople
Sportsmen with disabilities
Year of birth missing (living people)